Waheed Mirza (born 4 May 1955) is a former Pakistani first-class cricketer. A right-handed batsman, he is notable for having partnered Mansoor Akhtar in a world record opening stand of 561 in 1977. It occurred on 7 and 8 February, while playing for Karachi Whites against Quetta at the National Stadium in Karachi. Mirza scored 324 as part of that opening stand; he had not previously scored a first class hundred. Unusually, Akhtar and Mirza not only opened the batting, but also opened the bowling in both innings. The partnership remains the highest for the 1st wicket in first-class cricket.

Despite scoring this triple century, Mirza scored only one other first class century in his 60 matches, and averaged only just over 25.

He is a maternal uncle of the Pakistani Test cricketer Fawad Alam.

References

External links
 
 

1955 births
Living people
Pakistani cricketers
United Bank Limited cricketers
Habib Bank Limited cricketers
Sindh cricketers
Karachi Blues cricketers
Karachi Whites cricketers
Cricketers from Karachi
Sind A cricketers
Karachi B cricketers